Beaivi, Beiwe, Bievve, Beivve or Biejje is the Sami Sun-deity; the name of the deity is the same as the name of the Sun. The Sami Sun-deity is usually depicted as female, but sometimes as male. In Sápmi, north of the Polar circle, where the sun does not even reach the horizon in winter, the sun was widely venerated and played a major role in the cultic coherence. 

Beaivi is goddess of the sun, spring, and sanity, associated with the fertility of plants and animals, particularly reindeer. She made the plants grow so that the reindeer flourished and reproduced, and brought wealth and prosperity to the humans.

On the winter solstice, a white female animal or animals, usually reindeer, were sacrificed in honor of Beivve, to ensure that she returned to the world and put an end to the long winter season. The sacrificed animals' meat would be threaded onto sticks, which were then bent into rings and tied with bright ribbons. This is called the Festival of Beaivi. 

At the time of the year when the sun was returning, butter (which melts in the sunshine) was smeared on the doorposts, as a sacrifice to Beivve, so that she could gain strength during her convalescence and go higher and higher in the sky. At the summer solstice, people made sun-rings out of leaves and pinned them up in her honor. On these occasions, they also ate butter as a sacral meal. 

At the time of the year when Beivve returned, prayers were made for the people who were mentally ill.  The Sami believed that madness (in the shape of psychoses and depression) were provoked by the lack of sunshine and light during the long, dark winter.

In Sami myth, she travels with her daughter, Beaivi-nieida, through the sky in an enclosure covered by reindeer bones or antlers, bringing spring with them.

See also 
 Sami shamanism
 List of solar deities

References

External links 
 December 2003 Holidays- School of Seasons 

Sámi mythology
Sámi goddesses
Health goddesses
Fertility goddesses
Sky and weather goddesses
Solar goddesses
Spring (season)